Séro  or Séro Diamanou is a small town and commune in the Cercle of Kayes in the Kayes Region of southwestern Mali. The commune contains 18 villages and had a population of 23,281 in 2009.

References

Communes of Kayes Region